The Otekaieke River is a river in New Zealand, a tributary of the Waitaki River.

See also
List of rivers of New Zealand

References

Rivers of Otago
Rivers of New Zealand